The 2006 NASCAR Craftsman Truck Series was the twelfth season of the Craftsman Truck Series, the third highest stock car racing series sanctioned by NASCAR in the United States. It was contested over twenty-five races, beginning with the GM Flex Fuel 250 at Daytona International Speedway and ending with the Ford 200 at Homestead-Miami Speedway. Todd Bodine of Germain Racing won the drivers' championship, making him the first driver to win a top-three NASCAR championship in a foreign make vehicle (Toyota).

2006 teams and drivers

Full-time teams

Part-time teams
Note: If under "team", the owner's name is listed and in italics, that means the name of the race team that fielded the truck is unknown.

Notes

Schedule

Speed Channel, an entity of Fox, was the exclusive broadcaster of the series for the 2006 season. (Starting in 2007, two of the 25 races, the spring race at Martinsville and Mansfield, would be aired on Fox with the remainder on Speed). All races were held in the United States and carried live on Speed, except for the race at Dover, which started at 4 pm EST but was aired on tape delay at 8 pm EST.

Note: All times are Eastern Time.

Races

GM Flex Fuel 250
The GM Flex Fuel 250 was held on February 17 at Daytona International Speedway. Mark Martin won the pole.

 6 – Mark Martin
 30 – Todd Bodine
 9 – Ted Musgrave
 5 – Mike Skinner
 60 – Jack Sprague
 99 – Erik Darnell
 08 – Bobby Hamilton Jr.
 14 – Rick Crawford
 17 – David Reutimann
 10 – Terry Cook

Failed to qualify: Chad McCumbee (#06), Chad Chaffin (#40), J. R. Patton (#63), Carl Long (#28), Wayne Edwards (#24), Norm Benning (#89)

racetickets.com 200
This race was held February 24 at California Speedway. The polesitter was David Reutimann. Chad McCumbee, who finished 25th, suffered a 25-point penalty for an illegal modification of the carburetor's main body.

6- Mark Martin
30- Todd Bodine
9- Ted Musgrave
17- David Reutimann
60- Jack Sprague
23- Johnny Benson
16- Mike Bliss
14- Rick Crawford
21- Jon Wood
85- Dennis Setzer

Failed to qualify: Kraig Kinser (#47), Wayne Edwards (#24)

John Deere 200
The John Deere 200 was held March 17 at Atlanta Motor Speedway. Todd Bodine sat on pole and the race win was determined by a green-white-checker finish for the third consecutive race. This race was the final career start for Bobby Hamilton, who retired after being diagnosed with neck cancer and died in January 2007.

Top ten results
30- Todd Bodine
6- Mark Martin
23- Johnny Benson
9- Ted Musgrave
17- David Reutimann
21- Jon Wood
16- Mike Bliss
99- Erik Darnell
88- Matt Crafton
14- Rick Crawford

Failed to qualify: Chad Chaffin (#40), Chase Montgomery (#8), Carl Long (#28)

Kroger 250
This race was held April 1 at Martinsville Speedway. Bobby Hamilton Jr. won the pole.

Top ten results
11- David Starr
9- Ted Musgrave
88- Matt Crafton
6- Mark Martin
16- Mike Bliss
77- Brendan Gaughan
07- Clint Bowyer
5- Mike Skinner
85- Dennis Setzer
18- Bobby Hamilton Jr.

Failed to qualify: Tam Topham (#70), Chad Chaffin (#40), Justin Martz (#63).

Dodge Ram Tough 200
April 29 at Gateway International Raceway. Qualifying was rained out and the field was set by owner's points. As a result, David Ragan sat on the pole.

Top ten results
30- Todd Bodine
9- Ted Musgrave
17- David Reutimann
60- Jack Sprague
23- Johnny Benson
10- Terry Cook
18- Bobby Hamilton Jr.
11- David Starr
16- Mike Bliss
75- Aric Almirola

Failed to qualify: J. R. Patton (#63), J. C. Stout (#91), Nick Tucker (#31)

Quaker Steak & Lube 200

The Quaker Steak & Lube 200 was held May 19 at Lowe's Motor Speedway. Mike Skinner won the pole.

Top ten results

51-Kyle Busch
10-Terry Cook
30-Todd Bodine
1-Ted Musgrave
9-Ron Hornaday Jr.
17-David Reutimann
85-Dennis Setzer
88-Matt Crafton
75-Aric Almirola
99-Erik Darnell

Failed to qualify: Robert Richardson Jr. (#1), Chad Chaffin (#40), J. R. Patton (#63), Nick Tucker (#31), Bill Lester (#22)

City of Mansfield 250
The City of Mansfield 250 was held May 27 at Mansfield Motorsports Speedway. Todd Bodine won the pole. Qualifying for this event was rained out. A series record of 18 caution flags was set during this running of the City of Mansfield 250.

Top ten results

33-Ron Hornaday Jr.
60-Jack Sprague
11-David Starr
23-Johnny Benson
12-Joey Miller
88-Matt Crafton
85-Dennis Setzer
16-Mike Bliss
17-David Reutimann
59-Steve Park

Failed to qualify: Michel Jourdain Jr. (#50), Todd Shafer (#91)

AAA Insurance 200
The AAA Insurance 200 was held June 2 at Dover International Speedway. David Reutimann won the pole.

Top ten results
6- Mark Martin
50- Carl Edwards
30- Todd Bodine
16- Mike Bliss
17- David Reutimann
23- Johnny Benson
33- Ron Hornaday Jr.
14- Rick Crawford
60- Jack Sprague
51- Kyle Busch

Failed to qualify: Robert Richardson Jr. (#1), Ryan Moore (#40)

Sam's Town 400

The Sam's Town 400 was held June 9 at Texas Motor Speedway. Mike Skinner won the pole.

Top ten results

30-Todd Bodine
5-Mike Skinner
14-Rick Crawford
17-David Reutimann
23-Johnny Benson
85-Dennis Setzer
9-Ted Musgrave
6-David Ragan
08-Chad McCumbee
16-Mike Bliss

Failed to qualify: J. R. Patton (#63), Blake Mallory (#76)

Con-way Freight 200
This race was held June 17 at Michigan International Speedway. Mike Skinner won the pole. Johnny Benson captured his first Truck Series win and first NASCAR win in his home state.

Top ten results
23- Johnny Benson
6- Mark Martin
4- Bobby Labonte
30- Todd Bodine
88- Matt Crafton
14- Rick Crawford
33- Ron Hornaday Jr.
85- Dennis Setzer
10- Terry Cook
60- Jack Sprague

Failed to qualify: Robert Richardson Jr. (#1)

Toyota Tundra Milwaukee 200
The Toyota Tundra Milwaukee 200 was held June 23 at The Milwaukee Mile. Ron Hornaday Jr. won the pole.

Top ten results

23-Johnny Benson
16-Mike Bliss
33-Ron Hornaday Jr.
60-Jack Sprague
17-David Reutimann
4-Timothy Peters
85-Dennis Setzer
11-David Starr
14-Rick Crawford
10-Terry Cook

Failed to qualify: Mike Wallace (#31), Michel Jourdain Jr. (#50)

O'Reilly Auto Parts 250
This race was held July 1 at Kansas Speedway. Mike Skinner won the pole.

Top ten results:
10- Terry Cook
14- Rick Crawford
20- Marcos Ambrose
77- Brendan Gaughan
5- Mike Skinner
6- David Ragan
30- Todd Bodine
11- David Starr
23- Johnny Benson
17- David Reutimann

Failed to qualify: none

Built Ford Tough 225
This race was held July 8 at Kentucky Speedway. Marcos Ambrose won his first career pole. Unsponsored Ron Hornaday Jr. captured his second win of the year.

Top ten results:
33- Ron Hornaday Jr.
14- Rick Crawford
77- Brendan Gaughan
23- Johnny Benson
6- David Ragan
9- Ted Musgrave
88- Matt Crafton
11- David Starr
99- Erik Darnell
30- Todd Bodine

Failed to qualify: Robert Richardson Jr. (#1), Todd Shafer (#19)

O'Reilly 200
The O'Reilly 200 was held July 15 at Memphis Motorsports Park. Jack Sprague won the pole.

Top ten results

60-Jack Sprague
99-Erik Darnell
88-Matt Crafton
33-Ron Hornaday Jr.
16-Mike Bliss
6-David Ragan
17-David Reutimann
10-Terry Cook
5-Mike Skinner
85-Dennis Setzer

Failed to qualify: none

Power Stroke Diesel 200
The Power Stroke Diesel 200 was held August 4 at O'Reilly Raceway Park. David Ragan won the pole.

Top ten results

14-Rick Crawford
85-Dennis Setzer
33-Ron Hornaday Jr.
11-David Starr
16-Mike Bliss
10-Terry Cook
30-Todd Bodine
9-Ted Musgrave
6-David Ragan
99-Erik Darnell

Failed to qualify: Chuck Maitlen (#89), Rick Craig (#31)

Toyota Tundra 200
This race was held August 12 at Nashville Superspeedway. Erik Darnell won the pole.

Top ten results:

23- Johnny Benson
60- Jack Sprague
20- Marcos Ambrose
9- Ted Musgrave
77- Brendan Gaughan
17- David Reutimann
08- Chad McCumbee
30- Todd Bodine
88- Matt Crafton
10- Terry Cook

Failed to qualify: None

O'Reilly Auto Parts 200 presented by Valvoline
This race was held on August 23 at Bristol Motor Speedway. Mark Martin won the pole.

Top ten results:

 #6 Mark Martin
 #30 Todd Bodine
 #9 Ted Musgrave
 #23 Johnny Benson
 #11 David Starr
 #15 Kyle Busch
 #5 Mike Skinner
 #16 Mike Bliss
 #18 Bobby Hamilton Jr.
 #17 David Reutimann

Failed to qualify: Chuck Maitlen (#89)

New Hampshire 200
The New Hampshire 200 was held September 16 at New Hampshire International Speedway. Mike Skinner won the pole.

Top ten results

 #23 Johnny Benson
 #5 Mike Skinner
 #15 Kyle Busch
 #30 Todd Bodine
 #11 David Starr
 #33 Ron Hornaday Jr.
 #14 Rick Crawford
 #88 Matt Crafton
 #99 Erik Darnell
 #6 Mark Martin

Failed to qualify: Garrett Liberty (#89)

Las Vegas 350
The Las Vegas 350 was held September 23 at Las Vegas Motor Speedway. Mike Skinner won the pole.

Top ten results

 #5 Mike Skinner
 #9 Ted Musgrave
 #16 Mike Bliss
 #23 Johnny Benson
 #33 Ron Hornaday Jr.
 #17 David Reutimann
 #20 Marcos Ambrose
 #85 Dennis Setzer
 #46 Kraig Kinser
 #75 Aric Almirola

Failed to qualify: none

John Deere 250
The John Deere 250 was held October 7 at Talladega Superspeedway. Mark Martin won the pole.

Top ten results:

6- Mark Martin
5- Mike Skinner
9- Ted Musgrave
30- Todd Bodine
24- A. J. Allmendinger
17- David Reutimann
50- David Ragan
59- Chad Chaffin
23- Johnny Benson
33- Ron Hornaday Jr.

Failed to qualify: none

Kroger 200
The Kroger 200 was held October 21 at Martinsville Speedway. Jack Sprague won the pole.

Top ten results:

 #60 Jack Sprague
 #11 David Starr
 #99 Erik Darnell
 #6 Mark Martin
 #23 Johnny Benson
 #15 Kyle Busch
 #5 Mike Skinner
 #46 Denny Hamlin
 #14 Rick Crawford
 #4 Chase Miller

Failed to qualify: Bradley Riethmeyer (#49), Casey Kingsland (#7), Todd Shafer (#19), Jimmy Simpson (#64)

EasyCare 200
The EasyCare Vehicle Service Contracts 200 was held October 28 at Atlanta Motor Speedway. Mike Skinner won the pole.

Top ten results:
16- Mike Bliss
10- Terry Cook
99- Erik Darnell
17- David Reutimann
14- Rick Crawford
50- David Ragan
08- Chad McCumbee
5- Mike Skinner
18- Bobby Hamilton Jr.
60- Jack Sprague

Failed to qualify: none

Silverado 350K
This race was held November 3 at Texas Motor Speedway. Clint Bowyer won the race from the pole.

Top ten results:
46- Clint Bowyer
51- Kyle Busch
23- Mike Skinner
60- Jack Sprague
33- Ron Hornaday Jr.
6- David Ragan
17- David Reutimann
10- Terry Cook
99- Erik Darnell
20- Marcos Ambrose

Failed to qualify: none

Casino Arizona 150
The Casino Arizona 150 was held November 10 at Phoenix International Raceway. Johnny Benson won the pole. This race was unusual in that there was a short field starting this race (only 35 trucks started the race instead of the normal 36).

Top ten results:

 #23 Johnny Benson
 #6 Mark Martin
 #5 Mike Skinner
 #30 Todd Bodine
 #88 Matt Crafton
 #11 David Starr
 #60 Jack Sprague
 #17 David Reutimann
 #15 Kyle Busch
 #99 Erik Darnell

Failed to qualify: none

Ford 200

This race will be held on November 17 at Homestead-Miami Speedway. Mike Skinner won the pole.
Todd Bodine won the championship, and Erik Darnell won the Rookie of the Year.

Top ten results:
 #6 Mark Martin
 #77 Brendan Gaughan
 #99 Erik Darnell
 #18 Bobby Hamilton Jr.
 #60 Jack Sprague
 #46 Joe Nemechek
 #11 David Starr
 #17 David Reutimann
 #85 Dennis Setzer
 #10 Terry Cook

Failed to qualify: Robert Richardson Jr. (#1)

Full Drivers' Championship

(key) Bold – Pole position awarded by time. Italics – Pole position set by owner's points. * – Most laps led.

Rookie of the Year
Erik Darnell of Roush Racing took home ROTY honors. Despite missing the season opener at Daytona and switching teams after Dover, Chad McCumbee was runner up in the ROTY fight. Finishing a surprising 3rd in ROTY was former V8 Supercars driver Marcos Ambrose, who missed the first three races of the season. Joe Gibbs Racing development driver Aric Almirola was fourth and rounding out the top five was Bobby East. Third generation driver Kerry Earnhardt and female driver Erin Crocker were expected to make runs for the title, but did not perform to expectation. Rookies such as Boston Reid, Joey Miller and Timothy Peters all attempted ROTY but were released from their rides.

See also
2006 NASCAR Nextel Cup Series
2006 NASCAR Busch Series

External links
Truck Series Standings and Statistics for 2006

NASCAR Truck Series seasons